AS-204 was a Saturn IB launch vehicle that is associated with two missions:
Apollo 1, scheduled to be the first crewed Apollo flight, but the crew was killed on the launch pad
Apollo 5, the first test of the Apollo Lunar Module, which used the AS-204 rocket that was originally intended for Apollo 1